Miles de Courcy (died c.1720) was an Irish Jacobite politician. 

De Courcy was the son of Patrick de Courcy, 13th Baron Kingsale and Mary FitzGerald. A burgess of Kinsale from 1687, in 1689 he was elected as a Member of Parliament for Kinsale in the short-lived Patriot Parliament called by James II of England. During the Williamite War in Ireland, he was a captain in Boiseleau's Regiment of Foot. De Courcy was subsequently attainted, but he was restored to his estates under the Articles of Limerick.

He married Elizabeth Sadleir; their son, Gerald, inherited the title of his cousin, Almeric de Courcy, 23rd Baron Kingsale, in 1720.

References

Year of birth unknown
Year of death uncertain
17th-century Irish people
18th-century Irish people
Irish Jacobites
Irish MPs 1689
Irish soldiers in the army of James II of England
Members of the Parliament of Ireland (pre-1801) for County Cork constituencies
People convicted under a bill of attainder